The Mystery of Edwin Drood is an unfinished novel by Charles Dickens.

The Mystery of Edwin Drood may refer to various adaptations of the book:
 
 The Mystery of Edwin Drood (1909 film)
 The Mystery of Edwin Drood (1914 film)
 The Mystery of Edwin Drood (1935 film)
 The Mystery of Edwin Drood (1993 film)
 The Mystery of Edwin Drood (miniseries), a 2012 British television adaptation
 The Mystery of Edwin Drood (musical), first staged in 1985